Litri and His Shadow (Spanish:El Litri y su sombra) is a 1960 Spanish drama film directed by Rafael Gil and starring Miguel Báez Espuny "El Litri", Katia Loritz and Ismael Merlo. It is set in the world of bullfighting.

Cast
 El Litri (Miguel Báez) as Litri  
 Katia Loritz as Katia  
 Ismael Merlo as Pepe Aguayo  
 Pilar Cansino as Carmela  
 María de los Ángeles Hortelano as Ángeles 
 Pepe Rubio as Manuel Báez 
 Jorge Vico as Pelopunta 
 Roberto Rey as Viejo 'Litri'  
 Rafael Bardem as Don Alberto  
 Miguel Ángel Rodríguez as Pelopunta niño  
 Rosina Mendía as Sra. Pinzón  
 Luisa Hernán as Pepita  
 Manuel Arbó as Sr. Pinzón  
 Manolita Barroso 
 Julio Goróstegui as Director del colegio  
 Erasmo Pascual as Don Durezas  
 Morenito de Talavera hijo as Litri niño  
 Ángel María Baltanás as Narrator (voice)  
 Manolo Morán as Naranjito  
 José Isbert as Hermano Alejandro  
 Licia Calderón as Lucía

References

Bibliography 
 Bentley, Bernard. A Companion to Spanish Cinema. Boydell & Brewer 2008.

External links 
 

1960 drama films
Spanish drama films
1960 films
1960s Spanish-language films
Films directed by Rafael Gil
1960s Spanish films